Pye is an English surname. Notable people with the surname include:

 A. Kenneth Pye (1931–1994), American academic
 Bill Pye (1912–1996), Australian politician
 Brad Pye Jr. (1931–2020), American journalist
 Charles Pye (1820–1876), British soldier, Victoria Cross recipient
David Pye (engineer) (1886–1960), British mechanical engineer and academic administrator
 David Pye (furniture designer) (1914–1993), British furniture designer
 Elizabeth Pye (born 1946), British conservator and academic
 Ernie Pye (1880–1923), Australian rules footballer 
 Harry Pye (born 1973), British artist
 Harry Pye (footballer) (1880–1953), Australian Rules footballer
 Henry James Pye (1745–1813), English poet laureate
 Jack Pye, born John Pye, British wrestler
 James Pye (1801–1884), Australian orchardist and politician
 Jerry Pye, Canadian politician
 Jesse Pye (1919–1984), English footballer
 John Pye (1782–1874), British landscape engraver
 Len Pye (1911–1989), Australian rules footballer
 Lloyd Pye (1946–2013), American author and paranormal researcher
 Lucian Pye (1921–2008), American political scientist and sinologist
 Pye Min (1619–1672), King of Burma
 Patrick Pye (1929–2018), British sculptor, painter and stained glass artist working in Ireland
 Robert Pye (Roundhead) (c. 1620–1701), English politician who fought on the Parliamentary side in the English Civil War
 Robert Pye (Royalist) (1585–1662), English courtier, administrator and politician who supported the Royalist cause in the English Civil War
 Scott Pye (born 1990), Australian racing driver
 Thomas Pye (1708/9–1785), British naval officer and politician
 Walter Pye (lawyer) (1571–1635), English barrister, courtier, administrator and politician
 Walter Pye (Royalist) (1610–1659), English politician, supported the Royalist cause in the Civil War
 Wendy Pye (born 1943), New Zealand educational publisher 
 William Pye (priest) (died 1557), English priest
 William Pye (sculptor) (born 1938), English sculptor
 William George Pye, British businessman, founder of Pye Ltd
 William S. Pye (1880–1959), US Navy admiral

See also
Pie (surname)

English-language surnames